The 1956–57 Quaid-e-Azam Trophy was the third edition of the Quaid-e-Azam Trophy, the domestic first-class cricket competition in Pakistan. 

In a change from the first two editions, the 1956–57 competition was contested in four round-robin groups, with the top teams in each playing semi-finals and a final to determine the winner. Matches were played from 25 December 1956 to 8 March 1957, with the group stage matches played over three days, the semi-finals over five days, and the final over six days.

In the final, Punjab defeated the Karachi Whites by 43 runs, claiming their first title. Hanif Mohammad was the leading run-scorer in the competition, and Fazal Mahmood was the leading wicket-taker.

Group stage
The winner of each zone, marked in bold, qualified for the semi-finals.

Finals

Semi-finals

Final

Statistics

Most runs
The top five run-scorers are included in this table, listed by runs scored and then by batting average.

Most wickets

The top five wicket-takers are listed in this table, listed by wickets taken and then by bowling average.

References

Domestic cricket competitions in 1956–57
1956 in Pakistani cricket
1957 in Pakistani cricket
1956–57 Quaid-e-Azam Trophy